Captain Ralph Underhill Hyde (4 August 1894 –  12 May 1970) was a career naval officer who served in the United States Navy during World War I and World War II.

Education and World War I service
Hyde was born in New York, New York, in 1894.

Interwar service
He later served aboard the USS Columbia, and the  when it was commissioned as the navy's first aircraft carrier in March 1922.

In June 1922, he married his fiancé, Mariquita Penniman, of Quogue, New York.

In 1928, as a lieutenant commander, he became executive officer and navigator on the destroyer .

After a stint as officer in charge of recruiting in Pittsburgh, he served at the Bureau of Navigation at the Navy Department under Admiral Frank B. Upham until 1933, when he became the commanding officer of the  until 1936, with Lieutenant Milton E. Miles as his executive officer, during which time his ship was commended with E's for torpedo, depth charges, and gunnery, while operating out of San Diego.  During this time, the famous "What-the-Hell" Pennant was created.

After this command, Commander Hyde became assistant to the Commandant of Midshipmen at the U.S. Naval Academy, where he also taught seamanship and navigation, and trained reserve naval officers for duty in World War II.

World War II service
In 1943, he was transferred to the Office of the Commander in Chief at the Pentagon for duty with the Joint Secretariat of the Joint Chiefs of Staff as a liaison to the Office of Strategic Services.  In 1944, Captain Hyde traveled to Algiers, North Africa; Bari, Italy; Cairo, Egypt; New Delhi, India; Chungking, China; and Colombo, Ceylon to observe OSS activities and coordinate with area commanders, reporting back to the Joint Chiefs of Staff.  He remained in his post in naval intelligence as secretary of the Joint Intelligence Committee for JCS until he retired in 1947.

Postwar
Captain Hyde met with misfortune after his retirement in 1947, as his beloved wife, Skeets, died of cancer in November 1948, his mother died in May 1949, and he and his thirteen-year-old daughter, Betsy, contracted polio in August, 1949.  Although he remarried, he was confined to a wheelchair until his death in 1970.

See also

References

1894 births
1970 deaths
United States Naval Academy alumni
United States Navy officers
Military personnel from New York City
United States Navy personnel of World War I
United States Navy personnel of World War II
People with polio